C/2011 L4 (PanSTARRS), also known as Comet PANSTARRS, is a non-periodic comet discovered in June 2011 that became visible to the naked eye when it was near perihelion in March 2013. It was discovered using the Pan-STARRS telescope located near the summit of Haleakalā, on the island of Maui in Hawaii. Comet C/2011 L4 probably took millions of years to come from the Oort cloud. After leaving the planetary region of the Solar System, the post-perihelion orbital period (epoch 2050) is estimated to be roughly  years.

Observational history

Comet C/2011 L4 was still 7.9 AU from the Sun with an apparent magnitude of 19 when it was discovered in June 2011. By early May 2012, it had brightened to magnitude 13.5, and could be seen visually when using a large amateur telescope from a dark site. C/2011 L4 was spotted without optical aid on 7 February 2013 at a magnitude of ~6. Comet PANSTARRS was visible from both hemispheres in the first weeks of March, and passed closest to Earth on 5 March 2013 at a distance of 1.09 AU. It came to perihelion (closest approach to the Sun) on 10 March 2013. Original estimates predicted that C/2011 L4 would brighten to roughly apparent magnitude 0 (roughly the brightness of Alpha Centauri A or Vega). An estimate in October 2012 predicted that it might brighten to magnitude −4 (roughly equivalent to Venus). In January 2013 there was a noticeable brightening slowdown that suggested that it may only brighten to magnitude +1. During February the brightness curve showed a further slowdown suggesting a perihelion magnitude of around +2.

However, a study using the secular light curve indicates that C/2011 L4 had a "slowdown event" when it was 3.6 AU from the Sun at a magnitude 5.6. The brightness increase rate decreased and the estimated magnitude at perihelion was predicted as +3.5. Comet Halley would be magnitude −1.0 at the same perihelion distance. The same study concluded that C/2011 L4 is very young and belongs to the class of "baby comets" (i.e. those with a photometric age of less than 4 comet years).

When C/2011 L4 reached perihelion in March 2013, the actual peak magnitude turned out to be around +1, as estimated by various observers all over the planet. However, its low altitude over the horizon made these estimates difficult and subject to significant uncertainties, both because of the lack of suitable reference stars in the area and the need for differential atmospheric extinction corrections. As of mid-March 2013, due to the brightness of twilight and low elevation in the sky, C/2011 L4 was best seen in binoculars about 40 minutes after sunset. On 17–18 March, C/2011 L4 was near the 2.8-magnitude star Algenib (Gamma Pegasi). On 22 April, it was near Beta Cassiopeiae. On 12–14 May, it was near Gamma Cephei. C/2011 L4 continued moving North until 28 May. The comet may have had a sodium tail as Comet Hale–Bopp had.

Gallery

See also
 C/2012 S1 (ISON) – a highly anticipated comet that disintegrated near perihelion in November 2013.

References

External links

 C/2011 L4 (PANSTARRS) – Cometography.com by Gary W. Kronk
 C/2011 L4 (PanSTARRS) – Seiichi Yoshida @ aerith.net
 C/2011 L4 (PanSTARRS) animated orbit diagram – Shadow & Substance
 Elements and Ephemeris for C/2011 L4 (PANSTARRS) – Minor Planet Center
 The complete guide to viewing Comet PANSTARR
 The view STEREO-B will have of PanSTARRS in March (Bill Thompson via Twitter account Sungrazing Comets) / C/2011 L4 on 2013-March-09 (entering STEREO/SECCHI HI-1B field of view below the "2013")
 Update on comet C/2011 L4 (PANSTARRS) – Remanzacco Observatory (18 May 2012)
 Very quick high-resolution "first look" at PanSTARRS in STEREO HI-1B / 2013-March-10 GIF animation / 2013-March-12 up close (Twitter account Sungrazing Comets)
 Video of Comet Panstarrs seen from Paris
 Don’t let Comets PANSTARRS and Lemmon out of your sight … yet – AstroBob (19 May 2013)

Comets in 2013
20110606
Non-periodic comets
Oort cloud
Discoveries by Pan-STARRS